HNNK Hrvat Chicago ( Chicago Croatians) is a Croatian-backed soccer club from Chicago, Illinois. The club currently competes in the National Soccer League of Chicago, the premier semi-professional soccer competition in Illinois.

The club was founded in 1963 and is historically the most successful Croatian club in the US, though it has been overshadowed over the past few decades by another Croatian side from Chicago, RWB Adria. The height of Hrvat's success came in the 1970s and 1980s where they were one of the strongest state league clubs in the United States, making the final of the prestigious National Challenge Cup on three occasions.  HNNK also sports a youth program U7 through U10, building the Croatian soccer community.

Honours
National Challenge Cup runners-up (3): 1974, 1979, 1984
Illinois State Champions (4): 1973, 1976, 1978, 1986
National Soccer League of Chicago (2): 1971, 1973
Croatian-North American Soccer Tournament (7): 1968, 1975, 1976, 1977, 1979, 1986, 2009 
National Soccer League of Chicago indoor champions (2): 2004, 2008

Croatian-American culture in Illinois
Croatian-American history
Croatian sports clubs outside Croatia
Soccer clubs in Chicago
Soccer clubs in Illinois
National Soccer League (Chicago) teams
Diaspora soccer clubs in the United States